Eva Fuka-Engle (in Czech Eva Fuková, née Eva Podešvová, May 5, 1927 – November 25, 2015) was a Czech American photographer.

Biography
Fuka was born on May 5, 1927 in Prague, Czechoslovakia. Her father, Frantisek Podesva, was a painter and her mother, Marie, was a writer. Her grandfather was a founder of the daily Czech newspaper Lidové noviny.

In 1942, she attended the State School of Graphic Arts in Prague under Professor Rudolf Skopec, and later studied at the Academy of Visual Arts, from 1945 to 1950. She married fellow-artist Vladimír Fuka in 1950, and gave birth to her only child, Ivana, in 1951.

In 1967 she defected with her family to the US. Her first husband died from diabetes in 1977. She married David H Engle in 1986.  At the time of her death, Fuka was retired and split her time between New York City, Prague, Paris and the French Alps where she spent her summers.

Fuka died on 25 November 2015 at the age of 88.

Photography 
Fuka's artwork is characterized by surreal and melancholic effects, which she achieved by using her environment  to create unreal settings with a dreamlike atmosphere. She ranks among the founding figures of Czech photography who introduced different approaches to the practice by taking advantage of her surroundings to attain particular effects between lights and shadows. Her work as a photographer started in 1939, when her father gifted her a Leica. Later on, in 1951, she and her husband became friends with dissident intellectuals Jiří Kolář, Jan Hanč, Kamil Lhoták, Jan Rychlík, Zdeněk Urbánek, and Josef Schwarz.

In 1963 she published a monograph, an important step in her work as both photographer and woman artist, because photography was still struggling to be recognized in the world of art at the beginning of the sixties. A second monograph was published in 2007, by Torst, after Fuka had two big exhibitions, in 1996 and 2007.

References

1927 births
2015 deaths
Photographers from Prague
American women photographers
Czechoslovak expatriates in the United States
21st-century American women